Robert William Griffithss (born 15 September 1942) is an English footballer, who played as a wing half in the Football League for Chester.

Career statistics
Source:

References

Chester City F.C. players
Bangor City F.C. players
Association football wing halves
English Football League players
1942 births
Living people
English footballers
People from Aldridge
Rhyl F.C. players
Stoke City F.C. players